KHR may be:
 Cambodian riel, the currency of Cambodia
 Kharkhorin Airport in Mongolia (IATA code)
 KHR Arkitekter, a Danish architecture company
 KHR-1, a robot